Caleb Cortlandt is a fictional character from the ABC daytime drama All My Children, portrayed by Michael Nouri from May 24, 2010 until its final episode on September 23, 2011.

Television characters introduced in 2010
All My Children characters